American Skin may refer to:

"American Skin (41 Shots)", a song by Bruce Springsteen
American Skin (film), a 2019 film
American Skin, a 1998 novel by Don De Grazia